Ranmuthu Duwa was the first colour full-length Sinhalese language film to be produced in Sri Lanka in 1962. It was co-produced by Shesha Palihakkara, Arthur C. Clarke and directed by Mike Wilson, who also made his debut as a feature director. The film stars some of those who would go on to become big names in the Sinhala Cinema, such as Gamini Fonseka, Joe Abeywickrema and Jeevarani Kurukulasuriya in the leading roles. Playback singing was by Nanda Malini, Narada Disasekara and W.D. Amaradeva. The lyrics were written by Chandraratne Manawasinghe.

Ran Muthu Duwa was a landmark in the history of the Lankan cinema, which at the time was only 15 years old (having started in 1947). It not only introduced colour to the Lankan movies, but also showed for the first time the underwater wonders of the seas around Ceylon, which had barely begun to be explored.

It was also a commercial success: seen by more than a million people on its first release during 1962-63 - a tenth of the island's then population. But the cultural influence of the film went well beyond the box office. It starred in the leading roles talented young actors who would soon become big names in Lanka's film industry, especially Gamini Fonseka and Joe Abeywickrama. It also launched or catapulted the careers of a number of other creative or technical professionals.

Synopsis
The film is about the discovery of an underwater treasure. It involves a mixture of ancient legends, human treachery and romance.

Ownership
In the early 1980s ownership of the film was purchased by film and record producer, Vijaya Ramanayake.  Tharanga films and music currently owns and distributes the film.

Cast
 Gamini Fonseka as Bandu
 Jeevarani Kurukulasuriya as Kumari
 Joe Abeywickrama as Sena
 Shane Gunaratne as Rajo
 Anthony C. Perera as Bandu's uncle
 Austin Abeysekara as Danapala
 Vincent Vaas as Kumari's father, Muttusamy
 Thilakasiri Fernando as Swami
Eddie Amarasinghe as Sena’s friend

See also.
Cinema of Sri Lanka
Getawarayo
W. D. Amaradeva
Music of Sri Lanka

References

External links

 

1962 films
Sinhala-language films
1962 drama films